Edgar Valcárcel (December 4, 1932 - March 10, 2010) was a Peruvian composer and pianist.

A native of Puno, Valcárcel was the nephew of Teodoro Valcárcel. He studied composition at the National Conservatory of Music in Lima under ; further study followed with Donald Lybbert at Hunter College in New York. In Buenos Aires he worked with Alberto Ginastera; during his career he also studied in Paris, with Olivier Messiaen, and in Italy, with Riccardo Malipiero, Bruno Maderna, and Luigi Dallapiccola. At the Electronic Music Center he worked with Vladimir Ussachevsky; he later returned to Peru, teaching piano and harmony at the conservatory in Lima. Valcárcel received two Guggenheim Fellowships for composition, in 1965 and again in 1967. His music combines serial and aleatory techniques. He died in Lima.

References

1932 births
2010 deaths
Peruvian classical composers
Peruvian classical pianists
Male classical composers
Male classical pianists
20th-century classical composers
20th-century classical pianists
20th-century male musicians
21st-century classical composers
21st-century classical pianists
21st-century male musicians
People from Puno Region